This is a list of banks with operations in Singapore. Location of incorporation is provided in brackets for foreign banks. There are, at present over 150 banks and deposit-taking institutions, and 45 banks with representative offices in Singapore. (EFA=Exempt Financial Adviser; ACU=Asian Currency Unit; SGS=Singapore Government Securities Market)

Commercial banks
Commercial banks in Singapore may undertake universal banking, such as the taking of deposits and the provision of cheque services and lending, as well any other business authorised by the Monetary Authority of Singapore, including financial advisory services, insurance brokering and capital market services, as long as they are permitted under section 30 of the Banking Act. Since 18 July 2001, banks were no longer permitted to engage in non-financial activities.

Local Banks
In a bid to encourage consolidation of the local banking industry to form larger banking conglomerates better able to regionalise and compete with foreign banks, the government liberalised the banking sector by awarding greater liberty for foreign banks to operate in Singapore in 2001. Since then, the number of local full banks has shrunk by more than half to four today.

Full banks
There are presently five locally incorporated full banks in Singapore, owned by three banking groups. These full banks have the liberty to provide any financial service as permitted by the Banking Act.

Digital full banks 
There are currently three local digital banks with full bank licence in Singapore. Trust Bank was jointly launched by FairPrice Group and Standard Chartered Bank on 1 September 2022. GXS Bank is owned by Grab and Singtel. MariBank is owned by Sea Ltd.

Defunct banks

Foreign banks
There are presently 119 foreign commercial banks in Singapore, of which 28 are Full banks, 54 are Wholesale banks, and 37 are Offshore banks.

Full banks
Although foreign banks with full bank licences can also offer most commercial banking services to clients compared to local banks, they are restricted in terms of number of branches and automated teller machines.

Qualifying full banks
Liberalisation of the banking sector saw the government creating a new category under the foreign banks category, called the Qualifying Full Bank (QFB). The first four licences were awarded on 20 October 1999 to ABN AMRO, Banque Nationale De Paris (now BNP Paribas), Citibank (transferred to newly locally incorporated Citibank Singapore on 28 June 2004) and Standard Chartered Bank. Two new licences were issued in December 2001 as part of the second phase of bank liberalisation, namely to the Hongkong and Shanghai Banking Corporation and Maybank Singapore. These QFBs are permitted to operate up to 15 service locations.

In June 2004, the QFB licence was further liberalised. QFBs are permitted to establish up to 25 service locations of which up to 10 can be branches from 1 January 2005. These banks were permitted to share their ATM networks (this was achieved with five of the QFBs through atm5), and provide services via the EFTPOS network from 1 July 2002. On the same day, they are also permitted to provide the Central Provident Fund's Supplementary Retirement Scheme and Investment Scheme accounts and to accept CPF fixed deposits. In 2012, MAS announced new changes to the QFB scheme, requiring QFBs who are "important to the domestic market to locally incorporate their retail operations". Further, such QFBs, whose home countries have Free Trade Agreements with Singapore, will be able to operate up to 50 places of business.

Wholesale banks
Wholesale bank licences were first issued in December 2001 to replace the "Restricted Bank (RB)" licence as a reflexion of greater services which may be conducted by these banks. These banks may conduct the same range of services as full banks, except that they do not deal with banking activities in the Singapore Dollar, and can only have one main branch.

Offshore banks

Merchant banks

The typical activities of merchant banks include corporate finance, underwriting of share and bond issues, mergers and acquisitions, portfolio investment management, management consultancy, personal banking and other fee-based activities. Merchant banks may not accept sight or savings deposits or borrow from the public. However, they may accept deposits or borrow from banks, finance companies, shareholders and companies controlled by their shareholders.

Representative offices of banks
Citibank International Personal Bank Singapore

See also 
 List of financial regulatory authorities by country

External links

https://secure.mas.gov.sg/fid/
Address and Contact numbers of Singapore banks
Complete list of banks and branches in Singapore
List of banks swift codes in Singapore

 
Singapore
Banks
Singapore